The Geelong Customs House is a bluestone and freestone classical style public building in Geelong, Victoria, built in 1855. It replaced a small timber prefabricated building of 1838, which was later relocated to the Geelong Botanic Gardens.

The Customs House was erected near the Geelong foreshore to serve the needs of the colonial administration during the peak of the gold rushes. The building was designed by John James Clark and constructed by William Crocker Cornish in April 1855. The Geelong Customs House is listed on the Victorian Heritage Register, and City of Greater Geelong Heritage Overlay. The building is no longer used for its original purpose, but was restored in 2012, winning a National Trust Award, and now houses offices and the 'Custom House Restaurant and Wine Bar'.

References

Customs houses in Australia
Buildings and structures in Geelong
Neoclassical architecture in Australia
Heritage-listed buildings in Greater Geelong